Kinney Parking Company was a New Jersey parking lot company owned by Manny Kimmel, Sigmund Dornbusch, and mob figure Abner Zwillman.

History

Kinney Parking Company was incorporated in 1945 by Manny Kimmel. In 1961, Kinney reached an agreement with Abbey Rent-A-Car (founded by Edward Rosenthal) whereby Abbey customers would park for free at Kinney lots in exchange for a 25% ownership interest in Abbey. The relationship was fruitful and in 1962, Rosenthal and Kimmel decided to merge the two companies with Rosenthal adding two additional companies he owned, Riverside Memorial Chapel and City Service Cleaning Contractors, Inc. The new entity was renamed Kinney Service Corporation and taken public. In 1964, Kinney purchased Walter B. Cooke, Inc., which operated nine funeral homes in New York. By 1964, the company had $29 million in sales and 6,000 cars in its fleet with 100 franchised auto dealers in six states who leased cars under the Kinney brand.

Final years, merger with National Cleaning
On July 28, 1965, Kinney Service Corporation announced that they would merge with Terminal Maintenance L.I. Inc., a Long Island building-cleaning and maintenance company, however, the merge didn't happen by unknown reasons.

In 1966, the firm merged with the National Cleaning Contractors, Inc. (established by Louis Frankel in 1886 as National Window Cleaning and House Renovating Co). to form Kinney National Company, headed by Steve Ross, who had joined Riverside after marrying Carol Rosenthal, owner Edward Rosenthal's daughter. Ross pursued an aggressive expansion of the company's properties, first acquiring National Periodical Publications (publisher of DC Comics), followed by Ashley-Famous talent agency, then Panavision, and finally in 1969 Warner Bros.-Seven Arts.

Legacy

Warner Communications
After a financial scandal in the parking division, the non-entertainment assets were spun off again in September 1971 as National Kinney Corporation, and, on February 10, 1972, the remaining company was renamed Warner Communications, a predecessor to today's Warner Bros. Discovery.

National Kinney
National Kinney expanded from parking and building services into real estate development by purchasing the Uris Buildings Corporation from Harold Uris, but the timing was bad as the New York real estate market collapsed in the 1973–75 recession. The main Uris Building asset was soon lost to foreclosure.

In 1979, after some protracted negotiations, National Kinney attempted to purchase The Aladdin hotel and casino in Las Vegas in a joint venture with Johnny Carson, planning to rename it after the star. However, Carson's wife Joanna gossiped about the deal, and subsequent trading in National Kinney stock led to insider trading charges against third parties by the SEC and the disgorgement of profits.

In 1982, National Kinney sold its National States Electric division to an undisclosed buyer, and then agreed to sell its parking subsidiary, Kinney System Inc., to that division's chairman Daniel Katz and a group of investors. In 1985, National Kinney subsequently renamed itself to Andal Corporation and sold its remaining majority interest in Kinney System parking. Andal invested in the declining Steve's Ice Cream and merged in Swensen's before selling them off and unwinding its last operating subsidiary.

Further reading

References

1960 establishments in New Jersey
1966 disestablishments in New Jersey
American companies established in 1945
Transport companies established in 1945
Transport companies disestablished in 1966
Defunct companies based in New Jersey
Parking companies
Predecessors of Warner Bros. Discovery